is the 33rd studio album by Japanese singer-songwriter Miyuki Nakajima, released in November 2005.

Like some previous albums 10 Wings, Hi -Wings- and Tsuki -Wings-, Tensei is composed of the songs Nakajima wrote for her experimental musical Yakai. All the materials appeared on the album were originally performed on Yakai Vol. 14: "24-Ji Chaku 0-Ji Hatsu" which was taken place at the Bunkamura Theatre Cocoon during January 2004. Except "The Mirage Hotel" which was already included on her 2003 Love Letter (Koibumi) album (Ten-Sei features newly arranged version of a song), most of the songs appeared on the studio album for the first time.

From the album, "For Those Who Can't Go Home" was later released as a single (flip side was live recording version of "Relay of the Soul" which was taken from Yakai). It was featured as a theme song for the television drama Kemonomichi (adaptation of the novel written by Seicho Matsumoto) starring Ryoko Yonekura and aired on TV Asahi in 2006. "Relay of the Soul" was also used in the drama series called On'na no Ichidaiki aired on Fuji TV during autumn 2005.

Track listing
All songs written and composed by Miyuki Nakajima, arranged by Ichizo Seo
"" – 4:58
"" – 5:19
"" – 4:22
"" – 5:10
"" – 4:06
"" – 5:49
"" – 5:52
"" – 5:34
"" – 6:04
"" – 5:21
"" – 6:25

Personnel
Michael Thompson – Electric guitar, acoustic guitar
Nozomi Furukawa – Electric guitar, bouzouki
Shūji Nakamura – Acoustic guitar
Neil Stubenhaus – Electric bass
Satoshi Nakamura – Soprano sax, alto sax
Vinnie Colaiuta – Drums
Gregg Bissonette – Drums
Matarou Misawa – Cymbals, timpani
DJ Masterkey – Scratch
Jon Gilutin – Keyboards, acoustic piano, hammond organ, strings pad
Ichizo Seo – Computer programming, keyboards
Shingo Kobayashi – Computer programming, keyboards
Tomō Satō – Computer programming
Yousuke Sugimoto – Computer programming
Ittetsu Gen – Violin
Crusher Kimura – Violin
Sid Page – Violin (Concertmaster)
Susan Chatman – Violin
Mario De Leon – Violin
Kirstin File – Violin
Berj Garabedian – Violin
Peter Kent – Violin
Natalie Leggett – Violin
Robert Matsuda – Violin
Alyssa Park – Violin
Cameron Patrick – Violin
Robert Peterson – Violin
John Wittenberg – Violin
Takuya Mori – Viola
Denyse Buffum – Viola
Cheryl Kohfeld – Viola
Carole Mukogawa – Viola
David Stenske – Viola
Masami Horisawa – Cello
Tomoki Iwanaga – Cello
Larry Corbett – Cello
Maurice Grants – Cello
Dan Smith – Cello
Rudy Stein – Cello
Suzie Katayama – Strings conducting and contracting
Kazuyo Sugimoto – Harmony vocals
Fumikazu Miyashita – Harmony vocals
Julia Waters – Backing vocals
Oren Waters – Backing vocals
Maxine Waters – Backing vocals
Tery Wood – Backing vocals
Angie Jaree – Backing vocals
Wendy Fraser – Backing vocals
Carmen Carter – Backing vocals
Jim Glistrap – Backing vocals
Carmen Twillie – Backing vocals
Jess Wilard III – Backing vocals

Chart positions

Album

Single

Release history

References

Miyuki Nakajima albums
2005 albums